Reggio di Calabria Pentimele railway station is a railway station of the Italian city of Reggio Calabria, Calabria. Part of the Battipaglia–Reggio di Calabria railway, it serves the quartiere of Pentimele and the indoor sporting arena PalaCalafiore.

History 
The project of the station, realized by the company Italferr, was approved in 2009 by the Province of Reggio Calabria, together with the projects of other five stations located in the Reggio Calabria metropolitan area. Works began in 2015 and the station was finally opened on June 12, 2016.

Layout 

The station has two tracks and two side platforms, which are connected each other and with the street by an underpass and a series of stairs and ramps. Also, the two platforms are covered with steel shelters and 16 speakers and 2 displays provide information to passengers.

Services and connections 
The station is served by regional and suburban trains operated by Trenitalia, connecting the station with the other stations of the city and of its suburbs. During weekdays the station in served by 21 trains, during weekend by 8 trains. The urban buses operated by ATAM stop outside the station.

See also 
 List of railway stations in Calabria

References 

Railway stations in Calabria
Railway stations opened in 2016
2016 establishments in Italy
Railway stations in Italy opened in the 21st century